South Carolina Highway 692 (SC 692) is a  state highway in the U.S. state of South Carolina. The highway connects mostly rural areas of Orangeburg and Lexington counties with Swansea. It runs generally north and south though it is officially designated as an east-west highway with its western terminus at U.S. Route 321 (US 321) in Swansea and its eastern terminus at SC 172 east-northeast of North.

Route description
SC 692 begins at the intersection of South Church Street (US 321) and 5th Street in Swansea. After passing a pair of churches at the beginning of the highway, SC 692 heads east through a residential neighborhood and passing the football stadium for Swansea High School. It exits the town limits, curves to the southeast, and begins to travel through a more rural setting including farmlands and woods. It crosses Third Creek, curves to the south, and enters Orangeburg County. SC 692 continues south crossing Cow Branch and Gardner Branch. After its bridging of Little Bull Swamp Creek, SC 692 reaches its eastern terminus, an intersection with SC 172 in front of a church.

Major intersections

See also

References

External links

SC 692 at Virginia Highways' South Carolina Highways Annex

692
Transportation in Orangeburg County, South Carolina
Transportation in Lexington County, South Carolina